Irina Ivanovna Tarasova (born 15 April 1987, Kovrov) is a Russian shot putter.

Tarasova's results from the 2012 Olympic Games, where she originally finished ninth, were annulled for doping violation by the Athletics Integrity Unit in August 2022. All results from July 4, 2012 to July 12, 2016, were cancelled. This also included stripping of the gold (2015) and silver (2014) medals that she won at the European team championships.

International competitions

See also
List of European Athletics Championships medalists (women)

References

1987 births
Living people
People from Kovrov
Sportspeople from Vladimir Oblast
Russian female shot putters
Olympic female shot putters
Olympic athletes of Russia
Athletes (track and field) at the 2012 Summer Olympics
Universiade gold medalists in athletics (track and field)
Universiade gold medalists for Russia
Medalists at the 2007 Summer Universiade
Medalists at the 2011 Summer Universiade
Medalists at the 2013 Summer Universiade
World Athletics Championships athletes for Russia
European Athletics Championships medalists
Russian Athletics Championships winners
Russian sportspeople in doping cases